Euphorbia segetalis, the grainfield spurge, is a species of annual herb in the family Euphorbiaceae. They have a self-supporting growth form and simple, broad leaves. Flowers are visited by Plagiolepis pygmaea, Polistes, and nomad bees. Individuals can grow to 16 cm tall.

Sources

References 

segetalis
Flora of Malta